Thalassoma cupido is a species of wrasse native to the northwestern Pacific Ocean, where it occurs from Japan to Taiwan. This species can reach  total length, though most do not exceed . This species can also be found in the aquarium trade and is farmed in Japan.

References

cupido
Fish described in 1845